Björn Lekman (born 11 October 1944) is a Swedish speed skater. He competed in the men's 500 metres at the 1964 Winter Olympics.

References

External links
 

1944 births
Living people
Swedish male speed skaters
Olympic speed skaters of Sweden
Speed skaters at the 1964 Winter Olympics
People from Värnamo Municipality
Sportspeople from Jönköping County